Hero of Uzbekistan (Cyrillic Ўзбекистон қаҳрамони) is the highest national award in the Republic of Uzbekistan. It is awarded to citizens of Uzbekistan and non-citizens for merit to the country. The title "Hero of Uzbekistan" and the medal that comes with it, Oltin Yulduz ("Gold Star") are awarded by the President of Uzbekistan. The parliament of Uzbekistan first created the law establishing the award on 5 May 1994, and since then more than 50 people have received it.

History and creation
The title "Hero of Uzbekistan" has its origins in its predecessor title, the Hero of the Soviet Union, which was the highest distinction in the Soviet Union and Uzbek Soviet Socialist Republic from the award's creation on April 16, 1934, until the dissolution of the Soviet Union on December 26, 1991. The Supreme Soviet of the Republic of Uzbekistan, then the country's legislative body, created the Hero of Uzbekistan on 5 May 1994.

Notable recipients

See also 
 Hero of Russia
 Hero of Ukraine
 Hero of Belarus
Orders, decorations, and medals of Uzbekistan

References

External links
  Law of the Republic of Uzbekistan about the Creation of the Award "Hero of Uzbekistan"

Awards established in 1994
Orders, decorations, and medals of Uzbekistan
1994 establishments in Uzbekistan
Hero (title)